La Chata is a restaurant with multiple locations, based in Guadalajara, in the Mexican state of Jalisco.

The restaurant was established by Carmen Castorena in 1942.

References

External links

External links
 

1942 establishments in Mexico
Guadalajara, Jalisco
Restaurants established in 1942
Restaurants in Mexico